The Ministry of Economy and Public Finance is a cabinet ministry of the government of Bolivia responsible for overseeing the nation's public finances and responsible for formulating and implementing macroeconomic policies that preserve stability and promote economic and social equity.

Ministers of Finance 

Alberto Crespo Gutiérrez, 1941– ?
Víctor Paz Estenssoro,  1943–1946
Edmundo Valencia Ibanez, 1969–1970
Antonio Sánchez de Lozada, 1970
Flavio Machicado Saravia, 1970–1971
Raúl Lema Peláez, 1971
Edwin Rodríguez Aguirre, 1971–1972
Luis Bedregal Rodo, 1972–1973
Armando Pinell Centellas, 1973
Jaime Quiroga Mattos, 1973–1974
Victor Castillo Suárez, 1974–1976
Carlos Calvo Galindo, 1976–1977
David Blanco Zabala, 1977–1978
Jorge Tamayo Ramos, 1978
Wenceslao Albo Quiroz, 1978–1979
Guido Hinojosa Cardozo, 1979
Javier Alcoreza Melgarejo, 1979
Agapito Feliciano Monzon, 1979
Augusto Cuádros Sánchez, 1979–1980
Adolfo Aramayo Anze, 1980
José Sánchez Calderón, 1980–1981
Jorge Tamayo Ramos, 1981
Javier Alcoreza Melgarejo, 1981–1982
Lucio Paz Rivero, 1982
Alfonso Revollo Tennier, 1982
Ernesto Araníbar Quiroga, 1982–1983
Flavio Machicado Saravia, 1983
Fernando Baptista Gumucio, 1983–1984
Flavio Machicado Saravia, 1984
Oscar Bonifaz Gutiérrez, 1984
Gualbero Mercado Rodríguez, 1984–1985
Francisco Belmonte Cortez, 1985
Roberto Gisbert Bermudez, 1985–1986
Juan Cariaga, 1986–1988
Ramiro Cabezas, 1988–1989
David Blanco Zabala, 1989–1992
Jorge Quiroga Ramírez, 1992–1993
Juan Pablo Zegarra Arana, 1993
Fernando Illanes de la Riva, 1993–1994
Fernando Cossío, 1994–1995
Juan Candia Castillo, 1995–1997
Edgar Millares, 1997–1998
Herbert Müller Costas, 1998–2000
Ronald MacLean Abaroa, 2000
José Luis Lupo Flores, 2000–2001
Jacques Trigo Loubiere, 2001–2002
Javier Comboni Salinas, 2002–2003
Javier Cuevas Argote, 2003–2005
Luis Carlos Jemio, 2005
Waldo Gutiérrez Iriarte, 2005–2006
Luis Arce, 2006–2017
Mario Guillén, 2017–2019
Luis Arce, 2019
José Luis Parada Rivero, 2019–2020
Óscar Ortiz Antelo, 2020 
Branko Marinković, 2020
Marcelo Alejandro Montenegro Gómez García, 2020–

See also 
 Central Bank of Bolivia
 Finance ministry
 Economy of Bolivia
 Government of Bolivia

References

External links 
 Ministry of Economy and Public Finance

Government of Bolivia
Government ministries of Bolivia
Bolivia
1826 establishments in Bolivia